Dendropsophus gaucheri is a species of frogs in the family Hylidae.

It is found in French Guiana and Suriname. Its natural habitat is savanna near pools that are created during the rainy season. It is a common species during the breeding season.

References

gaucheri
Amphibians of French Guiana
Amphibians of Suriname
Frogs of South America
Amphibians described in 2001
Taxonomy articles created by Polbot